Centar Municipality may refer to:
Centar Municipality, Sarajevo
Centar Municipality, Skopje

Municipality name disambiguation pages